The HIST Award for Outstanding Achievement in the History of Chemistry (2013-present) is given by the Division of the History of Chemistry of the American Chemical Society (ACS).  The award was originally known as the Dexter Award (1956-2001) and then briefly as the Sidney M. Edelstein Award (2002-2009), both given by the ACS.

The Dexter Award was originally established by Sidney Milton Edelstein, a founder of the Dexter Chemical Corporation, to recognize an "outstanding career of contributions to the history of chemistry". As the Dexter Award, it was sponsored by the Dexter Corporation except for its final two years, when it was sponsored by the Mildred and Sidney Edelstein Foundation.  

The award was briefly known as the Sidney M. Edelstein Award from 2002 to 2009, but was still given by the ACS. As such, the Sidney M. Edelstein Award should be distinguished from the Sidney Edelstein Prize (1968-present), which has been given continuously since 1968 by the Society for the History of Technology to recognize "an outstanding scholarly book in the history of technology."

Recipients

HIST Award (2013-present) 
 2021  Mary Virginia Orna
 2020  Lawrence M. Principe	
 2019 	Otto Theodor Benfey		
 2018 	David E. Lewis 	 		
 2017 	Jeffrey I. Seeman 
 2016 	Ursula Klein
 2015 	Christoph Meinel	 		
 2014 	Ernst Homburg 		
 2013 	William R. Newman
 2012  No Award
 2011  No Award

Sidney M. Edelstein Award (2002-2009) 
 2009 	Trevor Harvey Levere	
 2008 	John Shipley Rowlinson 		
 2007 	Anthony S. Travis 		
 2006 	Peter J. T. Morris (Peter John Turnbull Morris)
 2005 	William B. Jensen
 2004 	Joseph B. Lambert 		
 2003 	David M. Knight 		
 2002 	John Parascandola

Dexter Award (1956-2001) 
 2001 William Arthur Smeaton
 2000  
 1999 Mary Jo Nye
 1998  
 1997 Bernadette Bensaude-Vincent
 1996 Keith J. Laidler
 1995 William H. Brock
 1994 Frederic L. Holmes
 1993 Joseph S. Fruton
 1992 John T. Stock
 1991 Owen Hannaway
 1990 Colin A. Russell
 1989 D. Stanley Tarbell
 1988 (Lutz F. Haber) 
 1987 Allen Debus
 1986 Robert G. W. Anderson
 1985 Robert Multhauf
 1984 
 1983 Arnold Thackray
 1982 John H. Wotiz
 1981 Cyril Stanley Smith
 1980 
 1979 Joseph Needham
 1978 George B. Kauffman
 1977 
 1976 
 1975  (Johannes Willem van Spronsen)
 1974 No Award
 1973 
 1972 Henry Guerlac
 1971 
 1970 Ferenc Szabadváry
 1969 Walter Pagel
 1968 
 1967 Mary Elvira Weeks
 1966 
 1965 
 1964 Eduard Farber
 1963 Douglas McKie
 1962 
 1961 James R. Partington
 1960 
 1959 John Read
 1958 Eva Armstrong
 1957 Williams Haynes
 1956 Ralph E. Oesper

See also

 List of chemistry awards
 List of history awards

References

Chemistry awards
History awards
History of science awards
Awards established in 1956
1956 establishments in the United States